is a railway station on the Iida Line in Tenryū-ku, Hamamatsu, Shizuoka Prefecture, Japan, operated by Central Japan Railway Company (JR Central).

Lines
Shironishi Station is served by the Iida Line and is 70.5 kilometers from the starting point of the line at Toyohashi Station.

Station layout
The station has one ground-level side platform serving a single bi-directional track, with a small wooden station building. Until 2008, the station had a single island platform, but was rebuilt in 2008. The station is not attended.

Adjacent stations

Station history
Shironishi Station was established on November 11, 1955, as a station on Japan National Railway (JNR), when the Iida line between Sakuma Station and Ōzore Station was rerouted to avoid the rising waters of the Sakuma Dam. Freight services were discontinued in 1974. The station has been unmanned since 1984. Along with its division and privatization of JNR on April 1, 1987, the station came under the control and operation of the Central Japan Railway Company.

Passenger statistics
In fiscal 2016, the station was used by an average of 19 passengers daily (boarding passengers only).

Surrounding area

See also
 List of railway stations in Japan

References

External links

  Iida Line station information

Stations of Central Japan Railway Company
Iida Line
Railway stations in Japan opened in 1955
Railway stations in Shizuoka Prefecture
Railway stations in Hamamatsu